The 2008 Speedway Grand Prix of Germany was the eleventh and closing race of the 2008 Speedway Grand Prix season. It was scheduled to take place on 11 October 2008, in the Veltins-Arena in Gelsenkirchen, Germany. However, the meeting was cancelled because the track (temporary) was deemed unsafe by the Fédération Internationale de Motocyclisme (FIM) jury due to adverse weather conditions. The event was re-staged at the Polonia Stadium, Bydgoszcz, Poland, on the 18 October and was renamed the 2008 FIM Final Speedway Grand Prix. The Grand Prix was won by Polish rider Tomasz Gollob, who also won the 2008 Super Prix.

Riders 

The Speedway Grand Prix Commission nominated Martin Smolinski as a wild card, and Tobias Kroner and Max Dilger both as track reserves. Kevin Wölbert later replaced the injured Max Dilger. The draw was made on September 29 at the FIM Headquarters in Mies, Switzerland. The SGP Commission re-nominated Maciej Janowski and Grzegorz Zengota both as track reserves. Track reserve Janowski later replaced the injured Niels Kristian Iversen.

 Draw Nr 17 change:  (17) Tobias Kroner →  (17) Maciej Janowski
 Draw Nr 18 changes:  (18) Max Dilger →  (18) Kevin Wölbert →  (18) Grzegorz Zengota

Heat details

Heat after heat 
 (60,44) Adams, Lindgren, Holta, Gollob (E4)
 (61,22) N.Pedersen, Andersen, Nicholls, Kasprzak
 (61,66) Crump, Dryml, Harris, Smolinski
 (61,69) Jonsson, Hancock, B.Pedersen, Janowski
 (61,91) Hancock, Andersen, Lindgren, Crump
 (62,22) Adams, Nicholls, Jonsson, Dryml
 (62,25) N.Pedersen, Holta, B.Pedersen, Harris
 (62,82) Gollob, Kasprzak, Janowski, Smolinski
 (63,91) Harris, Lindgren, Nicholls, Janowski
 (62,68) Adams, Andersen, B.Pedersen, Smolinski
 (62,78) Jonsson, Crump, Kasprzak, Zengota, Holta (T)
 (63,62) Gollob, Dryml, N.Pedersen, Hancock
 (62,88) Jonsson, N.Pedersen, Lindgren, Smolinski
 (63,12) Hancock, Adams, Kasprzak, Harris
 (63,75) Andersen, Holta, Dryml, Janowski
 (63,48) Gollob, Nicholls, Crump, B.Pedersen
 (64,44) Dryml, Lindgren, Kasprzak, B.Pedersen
 (63,79) N.Pedersen, Adams, Crump, Janowski
 (63,88) Hancock, Holta, Nicholls, Smolinski
 (64,37) Gollob, Jonsson, Andersen, Harris
 Semi-Finals:
 (64,27) Andersen, Adams, N.Pedersen, Dryml
 (64,25) Gollob, Hancock, Lindgren, Jonsson (X)
 The Final:
 (64,00) Gollob, Andersen, Hancock, Adams
 SuperPrix Final:
 (63,98) Gollob, Crump, Holta, N.Pedersen (T)

Super Prix 

For the Super Prix Final the $200,000 prize fund will be awarded as follows:
 $120,000
 $40,000
 $25,000
 $15,000

If a Super Prix event is won by a rider who has already qualified for the Super Prix Final, then the World Championship Final Classification following the completion of Heat 23 in Germany will determine who is awarded this place or places.

At the Super Prix Final in Germany, if a rider has won more than one Super Prix he will take the starting gate colour of his first Super Prix win. e.g. If he has won in Sweden (red) and Denmark (blue), the rider will have the red starting gate.

If qualified riders are unable to participate in the Super Prix Final due to injury or other circumstances, they will be replaced using the World Championship Final Classification.

A Wild Card or Reserve rider could qualify to the Super Prix Final in Germany.

It is the placing in the Final of a Super Prix which determines who qualifies, not points.

The Final Classification

See also 
 Speedway Grand Prix
 List of Speedway Grand Prix riders

References

External links 
 www.SpeedwayWorld.tv

Germany
2008
2008 B